The Concorde Stakes is a City Tattersalls Club Group 3 Thoroughbred horse race for horses three years old and older run over a distance of 1000 metres with set weights with penalties conditions at Randwick Racecourse, Sydney, Australia in late August or early September. Total prizemoney for the race is A$500,000.

History
Originally this race was run by the Sydney Turf Club, but after the merger of clubs in the Sydney area the race was scheduled in 2011 as part of the City Tattersalls Club meeting.

Grade
 1990–1996 - Listed Race
 1997 onwards - Group 3

Venue
 1990–2010 - Rosehill
 2011–2012 - Warwick Farm
 2013 onwards - Randwick

Winners

 2022 - Eduardo 
 2021 - Nature Strip 
 2020 - Gytrash 
 2019 - Redzel 
 2018 - Redzel 
 2017 - Redzel 
 2016 - Felines 
 2015 - Shiraz 
 2014 - Wouldn't It Be Nice
 2013 - Decision Time
 2012 - Tiger Tees
 2011 - Decision Time
 2010 - Reward For Effort
 2009 - Friday Creek
 2008 - Typhoon Zed
 2007 - †race not held
 2006 - Mustard
 2005 - Red Oog
 2004 - Taikun
 2003 - Private Steer
 2002 - Fouardee
 2001 - Phoenix Park
 2000 - Condotti
 1999 - Guineas
 1998 - Confiscate
 1997 - Armidale
 1996 - race not held
 1995 - Victoria Park 
 1994 - Just Awesome  
 1993 - Deposition  
 1992 - Final Card   
 1991 - Joanne
 1990 - West Dancer

† Not held because of outbreak of equine influenza

See also
 List of Australian Group races
 Group races

References

Horse races in Australia